Druidsdream is a historic house at 144 Gibson Avenue in Narragansett, Rhode Island.  It is a -story stone structure, completed in 1884.  It was built, probably by predominantly Narragansett stonemasons, for Joseph Hazard, a locally prominent landowner and botanist.  It has a cross gable plan, with its main facade divided into three bays, looking south over landscaped grounds.  The central bay has a slightly projecting pavilion, with the second floor bays filled with French doors and iron railings.

The house was listed on the National Register of Historic Places in 1989.

See also
National Register of Historic Places listings in Washington County, Rhode Island

References

Houses on the National Register of Historic Places in Rhode Island
Houses in Washington County, Rhode Island
Buildings and structures in Narragansett, Rhode Island
1884 establishments in Rhode Island
National Register of Historic Places in Washington County, Rhode Island